Tunumiit or Iivit are Greenlandic Inuit from Tunu or Kangia, the eastern part of Greenland. The Tunumiit live now mainly in Tasiilaq and Ittoqqortoormiit and are a part of the Arctic people known collectively as the Inuit. The singular for Tunumiit is Tunumiu.

Besides the Tunumiit, who live in the eastern portion of Greenland, Northern and Western Greenlanders are called Inughuit and Kalaallit, respectively. About 80% to 88% of Greenland's population, or approximately 44,000 to 50,000 people, identify as being Inuit.

Language
The Tunumiit language, also called East Greenlandic or Tunumiit oraasiat natively, is dialect of Greenlandic. (The official language of Greenland is a different dialect of Greenlandic, Kalaallisut; the Inughuit speak Inuktun, which is more closely related to Inuktitut, an Eskimo–Aleut language spoken in Northern Canada, especially in Nunavut).

Region
The Eastern Inuit, or Tunumiit, live primarily in the Ammassalik region, the area with the mildest climate in King Christian IX Land. Hunters can hunt marine mammals from kayaks throughout the year.

Ittoqqortoormiit was a settlement founded in 1925 by Ejnar Mikkelsen in Scoresby Sound. 80 Inuit settlers—70 persons from Tasiilaq and four families from western Greenland—were brought there by ship. The area has vestiges of former habitation, but it had been uninhabited for about a century at the time of the foundation of the new settlement.

There were two other Eastern Greenland groups in the long coast between Nunap Isua (Cape Farewell) to King Frederick VIII Land, the Northeast in Kangerlussuaq Fjord and adjacent areas up to Clavering Island, north of the Tunumiit, and the Southeast-Greenland Inuit in the King Frederick VI Coast to the south, but these are now extinct.

Art
An angakkuq or spirit healer named Mitsivarniannga from Ammassalik Island created a tupilaq "evil spirit object," for a visiting European in 1905. When no harm befell him for creating and showing this object to an outsider, others began making tupilait, which evolved into a popular art form. Residents also carved Ammassalik wooden maps, that traced the Eastern Greenlandic coastline. Customary art-making practices thrive on Ammassalik Island.

See also

List of Greenlandic Inuit
Demographics of Greenland
History of Greenland
Ittoqqortoormiit

Notes

References
 Hessel, Ingo. Arctic Spirit. Vancouver: Douglas and McIntyre, 2006 
Carl Koldewey, The German Arctic Expedition of 1869-1870: Narrative of the Wreck of the Hansa in the Ice.''

External links
 "Inuit Man in Kulusuk, Speaking Tunumiit Oraasiat (Eastern Greenlandic)," YouTube video
 The Prehistory of Inuit in Northeast Greenland - Arctic Anthropology

Indigenous peoples in the Arctic
Greenlandic Inuit people
Inuit groups